Robert William Brooke (born 5 May 1940) is an English cricket writer who has published over 20 books about the game, including those referred to in the bibliography below.

Born in Solihull, Brooke attended school in Dorridge and Yardley Grammar School in Birmingham. He is a longtime Warwickshire CCC member who served as the club's honorary librarian for several years.  He has also been active in MCC, the Cricket Society and the Association of Cricket Statisticians and Historians (ACS), of which he was the co-founder in 1973.

Mr Brooke was the ACS chairman from 1973 to 1979 and was the editor of the ACS journal, the Cricket Statistician from 1973 to 1985.  

As of 2003, he was the statistician and obituarist of The Cricketer. Some of his articles for that publication can be found on Cricinfo within their player profiles.

Bibliography
Who's Who of English First Class Cricket, 1945-84, Collins Willow, 1985,  
Cricket Firsts (with Peter Matthews), Guinness World Records Limited, 1988,  
Who's Who of Warwickshire County Cricket Club (with David Goodyear), Robert Hale Ltd, 1989,  
A Who's Who of Worcestershire County Cricket Club (with David Goodyear), Robert Hale, 1990,   
A History of the County Cricket Championship, Gullane Children's Books, 1991,   
Who's Who of Lancashire County Cricket Club, 1865-1990 (with David Goodyear), Breedon Books, 1991, 
Warwickshire County Cricket Club First Class Records, 1894-1993, Limlow Books Ltd, 1994,   
Warwickshire County Cricket Club (100 Greats), NPI Media Group, 2001,  
Middlesex CCC (100 Greats), NPI Media Group, 2003, 
 John Edward Shilton's Book,  Association of Cricket Statisticians and Historians, 1984.

Notes

Sources
 Brooke, R. (1984) John Edward Shilton's Book, Association of Cricket Statisticians, Haughton Mill, Nottinghamshire.  

1940 births
Living people
Cricket historians and writers
Cricket statisticians